The Traffic Club of New York is a prestigious Manhattan-based professional association composed of members who work in the transportation industry.  Participating members operate the day-to-day logistics of many American rail, trucking, and shipping corporations.

Club history
The Traffic Club of New York (TCNY) was created by a number of transportation magnates at the Arkwright Club on April 10, 1906, in reaction to Congress passing the Carmack Amendment to Interstate Commerce Act of 1887 and the Hepburn Act.

Since 1907 the TCNY has held an annual dinner, which became a prominent Club event, suspended only during World War II.  The Club dinner provides food, entertainment, and allows businessmen to make connections.

Presidents
The following people have served as President of the Traffic Club of New York:

 B.D. Caldwell (1906)
 D.W. Cooke (1907)
 George T. Smith (1907)
 C.S. Keene (1908)
 George A. Cullen (1909)
 Judge G.F. Moore (1010)
 F.E. Herriman (1911)
 E.G. Warfield (1912)
 A.F. Mack (1913)
 R.H. Wallace (1914)
 W.C. Hope (1915)
 Thomas Gantt (1916)
 T.N. Jarvis (1917)
 W.L. Woodrow (1918)
 Ralph S. Stubbs (1919)
 Fred E. Signer (1920)
 R.J. Menzies (1921)
 T.T. Harkrader (1922)
 Frank W. Smith (1923)
 W.A. Schumacher (1925)
 W.S. Cowie (1926)
 H.C. Snyder (1927)
 Charlton A. Swope (1930)
 Louis M. Porter (1932)
 Ralph P. Bird (1933)
 J.W. Roberts (1934)
 Charles W. Braden (1935)
 Henry R. McLean (1938)
 James M. Breen (1945)
 E.A. O'Brien (1956)
 Eugene V. Fitzpatrick (1980)
 William B. Rose (1981)
 Greg Snyder (2014)

Annual Dinner Guest Speakers
The annual Club dinner has had many notable guest and keynote speakers, including the following:

 Charles Evans Hughes (1907) Governor of New York
 Isaac Asimov (1981) Scientist, futurist
 David Paterson (2012) Governor of New York
 Admiral Edward M. Straw (2015)

References

External links
Traffic Club of New York website

Professional associations based in the United States